Roohi Zuberi (born 24 March 1959) is an Indian social worker and women's rights activist. Zuberi has also served as a senior cabinet member at Aligarh Muslim University.

Career
As a university student, she became district president of the National Students' Union of India. Zuberi is an advocate for minority rights. In 1986, she established the Women's Welfare Society in Northern and Central India (महिला कल्याण समिति). In 2000, she ran for mayor of Aligarh on the Indian National Congress' ticket. Zuberi advocated that there was the need for enacting a Muslim matrimonial code including the bride's consent to marriage.

On 30 January 2014, she was appointed to the Uttar Pradesh Congress Committee's Executive Committee.

Zuberi is currently president of the Women's Welfare Society in Uttar Pradesh. She is a member of the Executive Committee of Uttar Pradesh Congress Committee, and of the Minority Cell of the All India Mahila Congress.

Political career history
Distt. President NSUI, 1972–73
Secretary of Abdullah Girls College, 1972–73
Executive Member of Student Union of AMU, 1974–75
Vice President of Aligarh Muslim University Students' Union, 1980
President (ad hoc) of Aligarh Muslim University Students' Union, 1982
Founded Women's Welfare Society, 1986
District President Mahila Congress, Aligarh, 1992
General Secretary Mahila Congress, U.P, 1993
Vice President of the District Congress Committee
Member of the Uttar Pradesh Congress Committee (5 times)
Secretary, Uttar Pradesh Congress Committee, 1996–2008
Congress party Candidate for the post of Mayor (Aligarh), 2001
General Secretary, UPCC

Additional position held
Ex-Member Railway Board
Ex-Member Telephone Advisory Board
Ex-Member Lok Adalat, Aligarh
Ex-Member District Consumer Forum
Vice President Akansha Samiti, Formed by District Magistrate

Awards
 Bhartiya Nari Shakti Award for her role in women empowerment on 29 January 2014 at the Constitutional Club of India, New Delhi
 Rashtriya Gaurav Award, in the field of Social Work by the India International Friendship Society (2014)

Family background

Roohi Zuberi belongs to a family of Marehra in Uttar Pradesh, India. Her father, the late Mr. Bashir Mahmood Zuberi (Advocate) (1921-1993) was a freedom fighter in the Indian Independence Struggle against British Raj. He was also a social worker, a politician, and the Chairman of the Marehra Municipal Board. During his life, he gave much of his personal property up for the development and welfare of the local population. The B. M. Zuberi Hospital in Marehra, a civil government hospital, is named after him.

Mrs. Zuberi is also related to Maulvi Bashir Uddin who spent all of his assets to establish Islamia College in Etawah, Uttar Pradesh in 1888 which was a similar effort to establish another university as happened in the case of Muhammadan Anglo-Oriental College. He was a Congressite who wore Khadi and also published a highly respected paper al-Bashir. He was awarded Padma Shri, but he did not go to receive it, just as he did not go to receive the title of Khan Bahadur. Former President of India Dr. Zakir Hussain was also a student of this institution.

She is also the daughter-in-law of mathematician and former Parliamentarian Dr Sir Ziauddin Ahmad, one of the mentors of the Aligarh Movement and Vice-Chancellor of Aligarh Muslim University, who served as Vice Chancellor for three terms and later became the Rector of Aligarh Muslim University.

Matin Zuberi, was her maternal uncle and a scholar of international relations. Professor Zuberi was born at Marehra in the Etah district of Uttar Pradesh on 15 July 1930. After obtaining his Master's degree from Aligarh Muslim University, he went to St. Anthony's and Balliol colleges at the University of Oxford. On his return, he was appointed senior fellow at the Institute of Advanced Study, Shimla. He joined JNU in 1978 and continued there till 1995.

As a professor of international politics and disarmament studies at Jawaharlal Nehru University, Prof. Zuberi was an academic observer of international nuclear developments. His contributions went beyond academics. In three stints — 1990–91, 1998–99 and 2000–01 — he was a member of the National Security Advisory Board. On the last occasion, he participated in the preparation of the Draft Indian Nuclear Doctrine. Earlier, he was a member of the Indian delegation to the United Nations Conference on Disarmament and Development. Prof. Zuberi was also a member of the executive council of the Institute for Defence Studies and Analyses and the governing body of the Society of Indian Ocean Studies.

Education qualification
She started her education in her hometown Marehra and thereafter moved to Aligarh for higher education. Her alma mater is Aligarh Muslim University, Aligarh, Uttar Pradesh, India.

B.A in Political Science from Aligarh Muslim University.
M.A in Political Science from Aligarh Muslim University
L.L.B from Aligarh Muslim University

Personal life and family
Roohi Zuberi is married to Ahmad Zia-ud-din and they have three sons, Md. Zia-ud-din (Rahi), Shahbaz Zia-ud-din, Sheeraz Ahmad  and a daughter, Sadaf Ahmad.

References

External links
 https://books.google.com/books?id=uCsz_CwoxCoC&pg=PA110&lpg=PA110&dq=ruhi+zuberi&source=bl&ots=x3HnswmNbE&sig=TCZDv7DJ73Mjz2dXQ2uvkJcJRuU&hl=en&ei=C4VcTp_AFoLtrQeFmJHJDw&sa=X&oi=book_result&ct=result&resnum=6&sqi=2&ved=0CEAQ6AEwBQ#v=onepage&q=ruhi%20zuberi&f=false

1959 births
Living people
20th-century Indian educators
20th-century Indian politicians
21st-century Indian politicians
20th-century Indian women politicians
21st-century Indian women politicians
Educators from Uttar Pradesh
Educators from West Bengal
21st-century Indian Muslims
Indian National Congress politicians from Uttar Pradesh
Indian social workers
People from Aligarh
Social workers from Uttar Pradesh
Women educators from West Bengal
Women in Uttar Pradesh politics
20th-century women educators